Benthophilus grimmi is a species of goby widespread in the northern Caspian Sea at depth .  This species is common from Chechen Island to Absheron Peninsula.  This species can reach a length of  TL. The specific name honours the Russian ichthyologist Oscar von Grimm (1845–1921), who was Chief Inspector of Russian Fisheries in the Russian Empire who collected the type specimen.

References

Fish of the Caspian Sea
Fish of Western Asia
Fish of Russia
Benthophilus
Endemic fauna of the Caspian Sea
Taxa named by Karl Kessler
Fish described in 1877